Garáb is a village in Nógrád County, Hungary with 49 inhabitants (2014). The name comes from Slavic languages grab: hornbeam. See also several Slavic placenames "Grab" with the same motivation.

References

Populated places in Nógrád County